Falak was a two-year-old girl who was admitted to AIIMS Trauma Centre in New Delhi, India, on 18 January 2012, with a fractured skull and human bite marks on her body. She was brought to the hospital by a 15-year-old girl who claimed to be her mother. The girl told the doctors that the baby had fallen from bed. She was admitted with a fractured skull, broken arms, human bite marks all over her body and cheeks that had been branded by a hot iron. The doctors monitoring the baby said it was an intense experience and that even in the trauma centre they had never seen a baby in such a condition. 
Baby Falak died on 15 March 2012, after a cardiac arrest, her third in three months. At the time of her death, she was expected to recover fully although she was suffering from irregular heartbeats.

Family 
Not much was known about Falak's birth and family initially. In fact, the name Falak was also given to her by the nurses at the ICU. Falak was brought to hospital by a 15-year-old claiming to be her mother. Later, the police launched a search for her biological mother. On 1 February 2012, they claimed to have located her mother, Munni. In addition, she was discovered to have two siblings and had been separated from both and her mother as a result of human traffickers. Falak's mother Munni had been tricked into a second marriage by two women who assured to take proper care of her three children. The women then divided the children among them. Falak's sister was sent home to Bihar. She and her five-year-old were passed from one adult to another, till she ended up with a teenager who was living with a married man. These women – Lakshmi and Kanti Choudhry – were arrested.

Hospitalization 
The child was brought to Aiims by a teen-aged girl who claimed that she was her mother and that the injuries were a result of a fall from bed. But the nature of the injuries was inconsistent with the explanation offered.
During her treatment, she contracted meningitis and also suffered two heart attacks. She had survived six brain surgeries, had recovered from a brain infection on 17 February, including a shunt surgery to drain out water that was getting accumulated inside her brain, was expected to recover completely and was expected to be discharged. She was on ventilator for more than a month, as she had problems in breathing, and had suffered severe lung, blood and brain infections. Doctors had tried various combinations of antibiotics to control the infection that had shown results and the baby was taken off the ventilator and shifted into a ward on 2 March. The toddler had shown signs of recovery and doctors were calling her the "miracle baby" after she was taken off life support within weeks of being admitted. Nurses who took care of her said she was able to breathe on her own and lift her eyes, and there was movement in the limbs. "She would cry and the whole unit would go to see what happened to her. Each one of us was so attached to the baby and now she is no more. It is disheartening," said one of the nurses. Moved by Falak's plight, many Indians as well as people abroad had offered to adopt her after she recovered.

Death
Falak suffered a third heart attack at 9:40p.m. on 15March 2012. All attempts by the doctors to revive her failed. Deepak Agrawal, an Assistant Professor of Neurosurgery at the AIIMS Trauma Centre who had been attending on her from the day she was admitted there, said, "Since hers (Falak) was a medico-legal case, a postmortem was conducted. The cardiac arrest happened due to cardiac arrhythmia, a disorder of the heart rate when the heart beats too quickly. It happened all of a sudden. She was sleeping in her bed when the cardiac arrest occurred". Baby Falak was buried at Ferozeshah Kotla burial grounds by her mother on 16 March 2012, after Child Welfare Committee's directions.

Arrests
Ten people were arrested in the case along with Rajkumar, alias Mohammad Dilshad (his real name) the man who had abandoned the baby along with his teenaged girlfriend Lakshmi. The girl herself was the victim of abuse at the hands of her father Vijender. On 13 March 2012, the teenager was arrested and will be tried for culpable homicide not amounting to murder. Falak's five-year-old brother was also traced from the house of a vendor in West Delhi's Uttam Nagar locality while her sister Sanobar was traced by Delhi Police from Muzaffarpur in Bihar.
Doctors stated that she was playing with the nurses and had hence, been moved away from the ICU. On 15 February, Falak was reunited with her mother Munni, who was married to a man in Rajasthan. Her mother is now in a shelter at the Social Welfare Department's Nirmal Chaya Complex in New Delhi.

See also
 Child abuse
 Human trafficking
 Violence against women

References 

Violence against women in India
Human trafficking in India
Child abuse resulting in death
2012 deaths
2012 crimes in India
Incidents of violence against girls